Kang Jae-sup (강재섭; born 28 March 1948 in Uiseong, Gyeongsangbuk-do) is a South Korean politician and former leader of Grand National Party since 11 July 2006.  He was first been elected in 1988.

References

Living people
People from Uiseong County
People from North Gyeongsang Province
1948 births
Liberty Korea Party politicians
Members of the National Assembly (South Korea)
Kyeongbuk High School alumni
South Korean prosecutors